KTYK (100.7 FM) is a terrestrial non-commercial analog and digital radio station, licensed to Overton, Texas, and broadcasting a Public radio format, featuring news, talk, and elements of Classical, Jazz, and Blues music, as a part of the Red River Radio Network. KTYK features news programming from NPR and the BBC, and serves the Tyler-Longview, Henderson-Rusk County area.

History
KTYK signed on November 6, 1961 as KIMP-FM in Mount Pleasant at 96.1 MHz. KIMP-FM was the original FM sister to 960 KIMP. It moved to 100.7 MHz in the mid-1960s and changed call letters to KPXI in 1974. It carried a beautiful music/easy listening format until the mid-1980s, when it shifted to a gold-based AC format that began phasing out the older music and playing more uptempo songs.

By 1988, it went straight ahead CHR as "X-100". X-100 attempted to compete in the Tyler market with a signal that covered a large area of northeast Texas, but rarely showed significant numbers in Tyler due to its limited signal strength within the city.

In 1991, KPXI shifted back to an Adult Contemporary format, but flipped to country music by the end of the year. It ran various derivatives of country under the branding of "K-101" until it was moved to Overton and downgraded to a C3 signal in June 1999, so that co-channel KRJT 100.7 could relocate from Bowie to Highland Village as KLTY, which later changed calls to KWRD-FM, in order to rimshot the Dallas-Fort Worth Metroplex. After briefly running a stand-alone oldies format, KPXI was then simulcasted on the co-channel Highland Village licensed 100.7 MHz.

KPXI was owned by various members of the Ward family from its sign on in the early 1960s until it went into receivership in the 1990-91 timeframe. East Texas Broadcasting purchased it from the receiver and sold it to Sunburst, which owned other Tyler/Longview market stations at the time, when it began the process of moving KRJT into Dallas/Ft. Worth. Sunburst exited the radio business in 2000 and sold KPXI to Salem along with KLTY. Sunburst's other Tyler/Longview area stations were sold to Waller Broadcasting.

Jerry Hanszen purchased KPXI from Salem Media subsidiary Inspiration Media of Texas, LLC on June 3, 2009. In doing so, KPXI became the sister station to co-owned KWRD in Henderson, which Hanszen has purchased from former Tyler City Councilman Jerry Russell. KPXI would cease simulcasting co-channel KWRD-FM once the sale was consummated between the two parties, and launched a Classic Country format as "The Heartbeat of East Texas, KPXI 100.7 FM".

On September 12, 2018, a license transfer of the KPXI facility was granted by the Federal Communications Commission, from Hanszen Broadcasting to the Board of Supervisors at Louisiana State University and A&M College, after the two parties had reached a deal for L.S.U. to acquire the station. Neither sister station KWRD, nor its FM relay translator, was included in the sale.

On October 11, 2018, KPXI was taken silent, in preparation of the facility's acquisition by Louisiana State University. As a result of the sale of KPXI, now former sister station KWRD has returned to its heritage country format, along with its FM relay translator at 98.5 MHz, dropping NBC Sports Radio in the process.

Consummation of the license transfer also occurred on October 11, 2018, with KPXI dropping the longtime call letters associated with the facility that it had retained in the move from Mount Pleasant to Overton, changing to the current KTYK, which is representative of the programming focused target cities of Tyler and Kilgore, on October 12, 2018, one day after temporarily going silent in preparation of the transfer to Louisiana State University in Shreveport.

Programming
Red River Radio (RRR) is affiliated with National Public Radio, broadcasting many popular NPR programs, which include Morning Edition, All Things Considered, Fresh Air, World Cafe, Car Talk, Wait Wait... Don't Tell Me, and From the Top. Red River Radio provides local news segments on weekday mornings during Morning Edition.

KTYK HD2 airs Classical music 24 hours a day. KTYK HD3 utilizes programming from NPR and the BBC services to produce a 24 hour News/Talk format.

References

External links

TYK
Radio stations established in 1961
1961 establishments in Texas
Public radio stations in the United States